The Timothy C. and Katherine McCarthy House is a historic residence located in Madison, Wisconsin, United States, that is listed on the National Register of Historic Places.

Description
The house is located at 848 Jenifer Street and is within the Jenifer-Spaight Historic District. It is an example of Queen Anne style architecture.

History
Timothy C. McCarthy was a contractor who took part in the construction of the Wisconsin State Capitol and a number of buildings of the University of Wisconsin–Madison. The house would serve both as his residence and his office. It was added to the state and the national registers of historic places in 2002. Additionally, it is located within the Jenifer-Spaight Historic District.

See also

 National Register of Historic Places listings in Madison, Wisconsin

References

External links

Houses on the National Register of Historic Places in Wisconsin
National Register of Historic Places in Madison, Wisconsin
Houses in Madison, Wisconsin
Queen Anne architecture in Wisconsin
Houses completed in 1897
Individually listed contributing properties to historic districts on the National Register in Wisconsin